Wilhelmus Johannes Hendrikus Peters (born 20 July 1953), known as Jan Peters, is a Dutch former professional footballer who played as a forward. He made one appearance for the Netherlands national team in 1979.

Doping
In 2010 Peters stated that during his time at Feyenoord he and his teammates received performance-enhancing substances before important matches, such as before the final of the 1979–80 KNVB Cup against Ajax.

References

External links
 

1953 births
Living people
Footballers from Gorinchem
Dutch footballers
Association football forwards
Netherlands international footballers
Eredivisie players
Belgian Pro League players
Primeira Liga players
Segunda División players
Hong Kong First Division League players
FC Den Bosch players
Feyenoord players
K.V. Kortrijk players
CE Sabadell FC footballers
S.C. Espinho players
Seiko SA players
Dutch expatriate footballers
Dutch expatriate sportspeople in Belgium
Expatriate footballers in Belgium
Dutch expatriate sportspeople in Spain
Expatriate footballers in Spain
Dutch expatriate sportspeople in Portugal
Expatriate footballers in Portugal
Dutch expatriate sportspeople in Hong Kong
Expatriate footballers in Hong Kong